The 1993 Virginia tornado outbreak was a tornado outbreak that occurred in the Southeastern United States on August 6, 1993.  It was very rare in that most tornado outbreaks in this region occur in the spring.

Confirmed tornadoes

Petersburg–Colonial Heights–Hopewell, Virginia

This destructive tornado touched down on the southwest side of Petersburg, and rapidly intensified as it struck the historic downtown area of the city. Several well-built, multi-story brick buildings were leveled, along with a train station. A decorative caboose near the train station was ripped from its anchors and thrown 20 feet, pulling the anchors out of the ground in the process. Damage in downtown Petersburg was rated as F4. The tornado then moved through the Pocahontas Island neighborhood at F3 intensity, heavily damaging or destroying 47 homes and a church. A total of 100 buildings were damaged or destroyed in Petersburg. The tornado then crossed into Colonial Heights, severely damaging a strip mall, a K-mart, and a waterbed store. A Wal-Mart was destroyed, with three fatalities occurring at that location. Many cars in the parking lot were tossed and destroyed as well. Damage in Colonial Heights was rated as low-end F3. The tornado then crossed into Prince George County at F2 intensity, striking a sand and gravel company. Several cars and trucks were overturned, the second floor of a cinder-block building was destroyed, conveyor belts were twisted and overturned, and one person was killed at that location. Many trees were downed throughout the county. The tornado then struck the north side of Hopewell at F1 intensity, where it blew roofs off of an apartment complex. The tornado caused minor damage to an additional 49 homes, major damage to 13 homes and destroyed two other homes in Hopewell. The tornado exited Hopewell, weakened to an F0, and dissipated in Charles City County. From start to finish, this storm caused 4 deaths and 246 injuries. It was the deadliest Virginia tornado since 10 people were killed in Ivy on September 30, 1959. It was also the first recorded F4 tornado in Virginia state history. For a number of years afterwards, the remains of a damage swath (sheared, twisted and broken vegetation) through thick trees was visible along the west side of I-95 on the immediate north side of the Appomattox crossing. Perhaps one of the longest lasting reminders of the twister was on the Martin Luther King Jr. Bridge between Colonial Heights and Petersburg. As the tornado had smashed through the historic district, it ripped a traffic light off the bridge, and the snapped pillars remained until the bridge was replaced in 2002. As a result of the damage that occurred, a State of emergency was issued for Petersburg.

See also
List of North American tornadoes and tornado outbreaks

References

External links
 Tornado History in Virginia
 Damage from the 1993 Tornado Outbreak

F4 tornadoes by date
Virginia,1993-08-06
Tornadoes of 1993
Tornadoes in North Carolina
Tornadoes in Virginia
1993 natural disasters in the United States
Virginia tornado outbreak